The Band of The Royal Regiment of Canada is a Canadian military band that serves as the official regimental band of the Royal Regiment of Canada. It is the oldest permanently organised band in the Canadian Forces. It is based at Fort York in Toronto and is assigned to the part of 4th Canadian Division's 32 Canadian Brigade Group. The ceremonial dress uniform of the band is a scarlet tunic and bearskin, similar to Grenadier Guards in the United Kingdom, with the only difference being the plume is red over white, as a homage to the former Canadian Guards regiment.

History

The band was established in 1863, just one year after its home regiment was established as the Royal Grenadiers. It was originally composed of members of the Toronto-based volunteer militia band. The band received its first set of drums and instruments that same year. Due to its lineage, it was therefore referred to as the Band of the 10th Battalion Royal Grenadiers from 1881-1900 and later as the Band of the Royal Grenadiers from 1920-36. It assumed the name by which it continues to be known as in 1991.

On 1 July 1867, the band presented a formal concert in Queen's Park, Toronto, in celebration of Confederation of Canada. Under Lieutenant Walter M. Murdoch's leadership, the band was increased to 60. It also took part in the reception for King George VI during his 1939 royal tour of Canada and has played for every reigning monarch from Queen Victoria to Elizabeth II throughout its history.

Directors 
Captain John Waldron (February 1888-)
Warrant-Officer Harold Bromley (until 1926)
Lieutenant Walter M. Murdoch (1926-1958)
Captain Stanley H. Clark (1958-1968)
Captain E.J. Robbins (1968-1972)
Major Gino A. Falconi (1972-2000)
Captain William Mighton (2000-2014)
Captain Kevin Anderson (2014–Present)

Structure
 Headquarters
 Parade Band
 Concert Band
 Dance Band
 Big Band
 Fanfare Trumpeters

Headquarters
Director of Music - Captain Kevin Anderson, CD
Drum Major - Sergeant Steven Yasinsky
Band Sergeant Major - Warrant Officer Sheila Andrews, CD

Parade Band
The parade band is the marching contingent from the band that participates in parade public activities in Toronto.

Notable performances

Protocol
Performances for the Royal Family
State visits
Presentation of Colours
Mixed performances
Military Musical Pageant at Wembley Stadium
50th anniversary of the raid on Dieppe in August 1942
The launching of the ship the Hector in Pictou, Nova Scotia
The Summerside Tattoo in Prince Edward Island
2000 International Military Festival of Music in Quebec City
16th International Military Band Festival in Kraków, Poland
Stone Mountain Highland Games Military Tattoo in Atlanta, Georgia
Ticonderoga Tattoo
Rochester International Marine Tattoo in New York (state)
TRADOC Military Tattoo in Fort Monroe, Virginia
1967 Ontario centenary celebrations
Performing in Philadelphia with the RCMP's Musical Ride, as part of the US Bicentennial festivities.
Performance at Meaford Hall in Meaford, Ontario commemorating the role of the Regiment in the Liberation of Holland.

Discography

The band has made seven compact disc recordings:

 Ready Aye Ready
 In Concert, On Parade
 Footsteps in Time
 Fields of Honour
 Promenade
 Saeculum Aureum
 Freedom of the City

References

Royal Regiment of Canada
Bands of the Canadian Army
Musical groups established in 1863
1863 establishments in Canada